Buccaneer Yacht Club may refer to:

Buccaneer Yacht Club (Alabama), Mobile, Alabama, United States.
Buccaneer Yacht Club (California), San Pedro, California, United States.
Buccaneer Yacht Club International, Riviera Beach, Florida, United States.
Buccaneer Sailing Club, Pensacola, Florida, United States.
Buccaneer Boat Club, Nyack, New York, United States; now the Hook Mountain Yacht Club.